Purav Raja and Divij Sharan were the defending champions, but decided not to participate together.  Raja played alongside Marcelo Demoliner, while Sharan teams up with Adil Shamasdin.  The two teams met in the quarterfinals, with Shamasdin and Sharan winning the match.  Shamasdin and Sharan lost to Samuel Groth and Chris Guccione in the semifinals.
Groth and Guccione went on to win the title, defeating  and Juan Sebastián Cabal in the final, 7–6(7–5), 6–7(3–7), [11–9].

Seeds

Draw

Draw

References
Main Draw

Claro Open Colombia - Doubles
2014 Doubles